The Herrenhäuser Brewery (Herrenhäuser Brauerei) was founded in 1868 in the Herrenhausen district of Hannover, Germany.  There are number of breweries in Hannover, e.g. Gilde brewery was founded about 300 years earlier.

History
Herrenhäuser introduced the first kosher pilsener beer to the European market called Herrenhäuser Kosher.

Origins
The company was originally established under the name Brauerei Wölfler & Wedekind Herrenhausen.

References

External links
 Herrenhäuser Brewery homepage

Breweries in Germany
Beer brands of Germany
Food and drink companies established in 1868
Manufacturing companies based in Hanover